Athrips pruinosella is a moth of the family Gelechiidae. It is found in western and northern Europe. It has also been recorded from the Caucasus, the southern Ural mountains, the Altai mountains, Tuva, Buryatia, the Amur region, Primorye and North America.

The wingspan is 12–16 mm. The forewings are covered with greyish brown, cream-tipped scales. There are two indistinct dark spots near the base, two at about one-half and one or two small spots at about two-thirds. The hindwings are grey. Adults are on wing from the end of May to the beginning of August.

The larvae feed on Salix repens, Vaccinium uliginosum, Spiraea salicifolia, Andromeda polifolia and Vaccinium myrtillus.

References

Moths described in 1846
Athrips
Moths of Europe
Moths of Asia
Moths of North America